The 1992–93 West Midlands (Regional) League season was the 93rd in the history of the West Midlands (Regional) League, an English association football competition for semi-professional and amateur teams based in the West Midlands county, Shropshire, Herefordshire, Worcestershire and southern Staffordshire.

Premier Division

The Premier Division featured 17 clubs which competed in the division last season, along with two new clubs:
Alvechurch, relegated from the Southern Football League
Ilkeston Town, promoted from Division One

League table

Division One

The Division One featured 17 clubs which competed in the division last season, along with 2 new clubs:
Malvern Town, relegated from the Premier Division
Gornal Sports, promoted from Division Two

League table

Division Two

The Division Two featured 15 clubs which competed in the division last season, along with 2 new clubs:
Hinckley Athletic reserves
Tividale reserves

League table

References

External links

1992–93
8